Pterostylis orbiculata, commonly known as the coastal banded greenhood, is a plant in the orchid family Orchidaceae and is endemic to the south-west of Western Australia. The plants either have a rosette of leaves in the years when not flowering or stem leaves on a flowering spike. When flowering, it has up to twenty flowers that are reddish brown, greenish brown or green with a reddish or brownish labellum with short stiff hairs.

Description
Pterostylis orbiculata, is a terrestrial,  perennial, deciduous, herb with an underground tuber. The dorsal sepal and petals form a hood over the column. Flowering occurs from June to early August.

Taxonomy and naming
The coastal banded greenhood was first formally described in 2017 by David Jones and Christopher French and given the name Urochilus orbiculatus. The description was published in Australian Orchid Review from a specimen collected near Mogumber. In 2018 the same authors changed the name to Pterostylis orbiculata "to allow for the different taxonomic views held at generic level within the subtribe". It had previously been known as Pterostylis sp. 'coastal'. The specific epithet (orbiculata) is a Latin word meaning "circular", referring to the shape formed by the fused lateral sepals.

Distribution and habitat
Pterostylis orbiculata occurs in Western Australia from north of Geraldton to Bunbury with a few populations further inland. It grows in shruland, woodland and forest, sometimes around granite outcrops.

References

orbiculata
Endemic orchids of Australia
Orchids of Western Australia
Plants described in 2017